Fernando González is a paralympic athlete from Cuba competing mainly in category T11 long and triple jump events.

Fernando competed at the 2004 Summer Paralympics in the long and triple jump but it was he teamed up with his Cuban teammates as part of the 4 × 100 m he won a silver medal.

References

Paralympic athletes of Cuba
Athletes (track and field) at the 2004 Summer Paralympics
Paralympic silver medalists for Cuba
Living people
Medalists at the 2004 Summer Paralympics
Year of birth missing (living people)
Paralympic medalists in athletics (track and field)
Cuban male sprinters
Cuban male long jumpers
Cuban male triple jumpers
21st-century Cuban people